Securitas was the goddess of security and stability, especially the security of the Roman Empire.

Securitas may also refer to:

Securitas (Swedish security company), also known as Securitas AB
Securitas (Swiss security company), also known as Securitas AG

See also

Securitas depot robbery, cash robbery in England that took place on the evening of 21 February 2006
Security (disambiguation)